This article shows the Qualifying Draw for the 2011 Rogers Cup.

Players

Seeds

Qualifiers

Lucky losers
  Lourdes Domínguez Lino

Qualifying draw

First qualifier

Second qualifier

Third qualifier

Fourth qualifier

Fifth qualifier

Sixth qualifier

Seventh qualifier

Eighth qualifier

Ninth qualifier

Tenth qualifier

Eleventh qualifier

Twelfth qualifier

References
 Qualifying Draw

Rogers Cup Qualifying
2011 Rogers Cup
Qualification for tennis tournaments
Rogers